The 2021 Jeep Beach 175 was a ARCA Menards Series East race held on February 8, 2021. It was contested over 187 laps—extended from 175 laps due to an overtime finish—on the  short track. It was the first race of the 2021 ARCA Menards Series East season. Rette Jones Racing driver Max Gutiérrez collected his first career win in the ARCA Menards Series East.

Background

Entry list 

 (R) denotes rookie driver.
 (i) denotes driver who is ineligible for series driver points.

Practice 

Qualifying
Taylor Gray earned the pole award, posting a time of 18.768 seconds and a speed of

Starting Lineups

Race

Race results

References 

2021 in sports in Florida
Jeep Beach 175
2021 ARCA Menards Series East